Georgina is an outback locality in the Shire of Boulia, Queensland, Australia.

Geography 
Georgina is in the Channel Country. All watercourses in this area are part of the Lake Eyre drainage basin, and most will dry up before their water reaches Lake Eyre.

The predominant land use is grazing on native vegetation.

Education 
There are no schools in Georgina. The nearest primary schools are in Boulia, Dajarra and Urandangi. The nearest secondary schools are in Mount Isa and Winton and are too far for a daily commute. The Spinifex State College in Mount Isa offers boarding facilities. Other boarding schools or distance education would be options.

References 

Shire of Boulia
Localities in Queensland